The Praja Rajyam Party was a political party in India.

Formation 
The first public meeting was held by Chiranjeevi on 26 August 2008, at Tirupati, Andhra Pradesh. He addressed a gathering of about a million people and announced the party name and its agenda. The party flag, which has white colour making up 3/4 of the height at the top, and the bottom 1/4 filled with green, was unveiled at the meeting. In the middle of the flag, a red-coloured sun symbol is encircled with a yellow line.

The green colour is an "acknowledgement to the farmers", red symbolises "change and revolution", the yellow border around the sun symbolises "happiness in every home", white symbolises "clean governance and transparency", and the sun in the middle emphasises the need for change and revolution.

Merger with NTPP 

The Nava Telangana Praja Party headed by former minister Tulla Devender Goud was merged with the Praja Rajyam Party. NTPP was a political entity campaigning for Telangana State formation, and had a strong base in the Telangana Region of Andhra Pradesh. Post-merger, Goud was made the Vice-President of Praja Rajyam Party.

Chiranjeevi at one time expressed his support for the efforts to forge a "Fourth Front" at the national level.

Electoral history 

They won only 18 out of a possible 294 assembly seats. The party leader, Chiranjeevi contested in two assembly seats - Tirupathi and Palakollu (West Godavari District) - and won only in Tirupathi. It polled 18% votes.

List of Members Elected

Manifesto 

 The PRP party will give footwear to poor families, distribution of land among the poor and total prohibition in phases.
 In the manifesto, Chiranjeevi said if voted to power, the first file his party would sign would be for supply of grocery items for Rs. 1000 per month for every poor family and will also supply cooking gas cylinder for Rs. 100.
 The manifesto promised many populist schemes to counter the Telugu Desam Party's free colour television and cash transfer scheme for poor and schemes like Rs. 20 a kg of rice currently being implemented by the Congress government. The grocery scheme was aimed to provide food security to the poor.
 The party also vowed to usher in 'gram swaraj' by transferring powers and finances to village-level bodies.
 Promising to continue the current scheme of free electricity to farmers, the manifesto said the duration would be increased from the present seven hours to 24 hours. It said it would provide social security to farmers by introducing a pension scheme for them.
 Under another populist scheme promised in the manifesto, the government would deposit Rs. 10,00,000 in the name of every newborn girl. She would be paid the amount on reaching the age of 15 years.
 All women will get free education from kindergarten (LG) to post-graduation (PG) level. The women members of self-help DWACRA groups will be provided interest-free loans. Women will also be provided 50 percent reservations in appointment of teachers.
 The PRP promised creation of half a million jobs in 1,000 days. It said it would also pay unemployment allowance of Rs. 10,000 a month to every unemployed youth, and assured Rs. 1,500 monthly pension to physically challenged.
 The party said it would try to introduce total prohibition in phases and shut down all 'belt shops' (illegal counters of licensed liquor shops).

Merger into Congress Party  
On 6 February 2011, PRP chief Chiranjeevi announced that his party would be merged with the Indian National Congress party after a meeting with Congress chief Sonia Gandhi. The merger was proposed by A.K. Antony, Minister of Defence. He stated that he had originally been compelled to create the PRP on a platform of fighting corruption and ensuring social justice but that Congress now had a good record of fighting corruption elsewhere.

It was asserted by political observers that Chiranjeevi's move may have been prompted by his loss of support in the wake of his own strong anti-Telangana stance in previous months. It was argued in the press that Chiranjeevi's move would particularly strengthen Congress' hand in retaining the Kapu (caste) vote, as the PRP had done particularly well among them.

References

External links 
 Prajarajyam party's meeting held in Rajahmundry

Defunct political parties in Andhra Pradesh
Political parties established in 2008
Political parties disestablished in 2011
2008 establishments in Andhra Pradesh